Wakool  is a town in the western Riverina region of New South Wales, Australia.

History
Wakool Post Office opened on 1 January 1870 and closed in 1874. It reopened in 1926.

Closer settlement of the Wakool area commenced in the 1890s and the town grew around a railway station established on the line between Echuca and Balranald. In 1942, rice growing was established in the area.  Other industries include wool and cattle.

Heritage listings 
Wakool has a number of heritage-listed sites, including:
 Moulamein Highway: Murray Downs Homestead

Current facilities
The town includes a cafe/post office, hotel and services club. Education is available to primary level at Wakool Burraboi Public School; High School students must travel to Barham or Deniliquin.

Sport
The town used to have an Australian rules football club, which played in the Golden Rivers Football League from 1958-2015, and then in 2017 and 2018. The team managed to win seven premierships, in seasons 1976, 1978, 1980, 1989, 1990, 2006 and 2013.

Gallery

References

External links

SMH Travel - Wakool page (was Walkabout Australia).
Murray River Council - Official Website.
Community site

Towns in the Riverina
Murray River Council